The ITK Open was a tournament for professional female tennis players played on outdoor hard courts. The event was classified as a $50,000 ITF Women's Circuit tournament. It was held in Istanbul, Turkey, in 2011.

Past finals

Women's singles

Women's doubles

External links 
 Official website
 ITF search 

ITF Women's World Tennis Tour
Hard court tennis tournaments
Tennis tournaments in Turkey